Kirk Steven Millar (born 7 July 1992) is a Northern Irish footballer who plays for NIFL Premiership side Linfield.

Career

Oldham Athletic
He joined Oldham's Centre of Excellence as a first year scholar in May 2009, having previously been at Linfield from the age of ten, progressing to reserve team football at the age of fifteen and then making a first team appearance at the age of sixteen.

He made his Football League debut on 13 March 2010 as a substitute during a 2–2 draw with Wycombe Wanderers and started his first match for the club on 30 March in a 3–2 defeat against Brentford. He was offered a two-year professional contract by Oldham in April 2010, twelve months ahead of his scholarship expiring.
Millar's chances of establishing a first team place for Oldham Athletic in the 2011–12 season were dealt a blow as he was sent off in a reserves team match against Morecambe for clashing with the keeper Lawrie Walker just after recently being told by the manager Paul Dickov that he was going to be given a chance to show his ability at the end of the 2010–11 season.

Millar had scarcely featured for Latics throughout the 2012–13 season but found a place in the team when Paul Dickov left the club and new man Lee Johnson arrived. Millar played a crucial part in Oldham's survival, assisting several goals, most notably Matt Smith's late winner against Bury FC at Gigg Lane. Millar scored his first & only goal for Oldham during the last game of the season against Leyton Orient, slotting the ball into the bottom right hand corner to make it 1–1.

At the end of the 2013–14 season, a season in which he was limited to a few substitute appearances, Millar was released after 6 years at the club.

Chorley (Loan)
In October 2012 he joined Chorley on loan for a one-month period and made his club debut on 16 October in a Northern Premier League match against AFC Fylde.

Millar made a guest appearance and scored for Shamrock Rovers in a friendly against Wolves in July 2014 at Tallaght Stadium.

Linfield 
In August 2014, Linfield manager Warren Feeney announced the signing of Millar on a free transfer. Millar signed a 2-year contract following a trial period with the club.

International career
In February 2011 Millar received a call-up to the Northern Ireland Under-21 team On 9 February 2011 Millar received his first cap coming on as a second-half substitute against Wales Under-21. On 13 May 2011, Millar was called up for stand-bye for the Northern Ireland U-21 in their euro qualifier against Faroe Islands Under-21.

In June 2011 he received his first call-up to the Northern Ireland Under-20 team, along with teammate Carl Winchester for July's Milk Cup tournament.

Career statistics

References

External links

Profile at Oldham Athletic

1992 births
Living people
Linfield F.C. players
Oldham Athletic A.F.C. players
NIFL Premiership players
English Football League players
Association footballers from Northern Ireland
Northern Ireland under-21 international footballers
Chorley F.C. players
Northern Premier League players
Shamrock Rovers F.C. guest players
Association football forwards